Sherman Guity (born 3 December 1996) is a Costa Rican Paralympic athlete. He won the silver medal in the men's 100 metres T64 event at the 2020 Summer Paralympics held in Tokyo, Japan. This was the first medal won by a competitor representing Costa Rica at the Paralympics. He also won the gold medal in the men's 200 metres T64 event.

He was banned from 23 July 2019 to 22 July 2021 after testing positive for a banned substance. This meant that he could not compete at the 2019 Parapan American Games in Lima, Peru and the 2019 World Para Athletics Championships in Dubai, United Arab Emirates.

References

External links 
 

Living people
1996 births
Place of birth missing (living people)
Paralympic athletes of Costa Rica
Athletes (track and field) at the 2020 Summer Paralympics
Medalists at the 2020 Summer Paralympics
Paralympic gold medalists for Costa Rica
Paralympic silver medalists for Costa Rica
Paralympic medalists in athletics (track and field)
Costa Rican male sprinters
21st-century Costa Rican people